Amazing Love is the seventeenth studio album by American country music artist Charley Pride. It was released in 1973 on the RCA Victor label (catalog no. APL1-0397).

The album debuted on the Billboard magazine's country album chart on December 29, 1973, peaked at No. 1, and remained on the chart for a total of 27 weeks. The album also included the No. 1 hit single "Amazing Love".

It was awarded three stars from the web site AllMusic.

Track listing

See also
 Charley Pride discography

References

1973 albums
Charley Pride albums
RCA Records albums